Sören Kaufmann (born 8 May 1971 in Augsburg) is a German slalom canoeist who competed from the late 1980s to the mid-2000s (decade). He won four medals at the ICF Canoe Slalom World Championships with a gold (C1 team: 1995), two silvers (C1: 1995, C1 team: 2002), and a bronze (C1: 1993).

He won three medals at the European Championships (1 gold and 2 silvers).

Kaufmann also competed in three Summer Olympics, earning his best finish of sixth in the C1 event in Sydney in 2000.

As of 2017 he is the German national team coach for canoeists.

World Cup individual podiums

References

External links
 

1971 births
Canoeists at the 1992 Summer Olympics
Canoeists at the 1996 Summer Olympics
Canoeists at the 2000 Summer Olympics
German male canoeists
Living people
Olympic canoeists of Germany
Sportspeople from Augsburg
Medalists at the ICF Canoe Slalom World Championships